William Howard Oatman IV (born December 1, 1965) is a left-handed American ten-pin bowler and a member of the Professional Bowlers Association. During 2006–07, his PBA ranking was 37. He has bowled 4 perfect 300 games in PBA competition. Billy Oatman has bowled over 190 perfect 300 games and over 70 800 series.  His nickname is Billy O.

Billy has one daughter named Taylor Imani. At eight years of age, he was bowling in three leagues. He worked in his mother's health food store before becoming a PBA bowler. In 2006–07 he became the first ever African American PBA Rookie of the Year. (See PBA Bowling Tour: 2006-07 season.) He won over $160,000 in his brief PBA career.

External links
PBA bio

1965 births
Living people
Sportspeople from Chicago
American ten-pin bowling players
Vincennes University alumni
Wichita State University alumni